Junjala is a small village in Nagaur district, Rajasthan, India.

Location
Junjala is located at a distance of 41 km from Nagaur in the south direction on Nagaur - Merta Road. Nearest railway station is also Mundwa or Nagaur.

Fair

Gusainji temple is situated at village. People come from Rajasthan, Punjab, Haryana, Gujarat, Madhya Pradesh and Uttar Pradesh. Fairs are organized here twice on chaitra sudi 1-2 and Ashwin sudi 1-2.

References

Villages in Nagaur district